St John the Baptist Church, also known as St John's Roman Catholic Church, is located in Perth, Perth and Kinross, Scotland. It is a Roman Catholic congregation, based on Melville Street, to the north of the city centre. Completed in 1832, it is now a Category C listed building.

A traceried window was inserted at that time.

In 1892, its roof was raised over the older portion, and its apse completed, the work of Andrew Heiton.

Its parish includes the church of St Mary Magdalene's on Glenearn Road, and it serves the central and northern parts of the Perth, as well as the rural parts north and east of the city.

The church is part of the Roman Catholic Diocese of Dunkeld, which covers east central Scotland. Its priest, since 1998, is the Very Rev. Steven Canon Mulholland.

See also

List of listed buildings in Perth, Scotland

References

External links
 

Category C listed buildings in Perth and Kinross
Listed churches in Scotland
John's Episcopalian, Saint
1832 establishments in Scotland
Listed buildings in Perth, Scotland
Roman Catholic churches completed in 1832
Episcopal church buildings in Scotland
Listed Roman Catholic churches in Scotland
Roman Catholic churches in Scotland